A cabal is a group of people united in some design.

Cabal or the Cabal may also refer to:

 The Cabal Ministry, a government under King Charles II of England
 Cabal (set theory), an American group of mathematicians concentrated in southern California
 Cabal (surname)
 Conway Cabal, an effort to remove George Washington as commander of the Continental Army during the Revolutionary War
 Santa Rosa de Cabal, a town and municipality in the Risaralda Department, Colombia

Fiction 
 Cabal (novella), a 1988 horror novella by Clive Barker
 Cabal (Dibdin novel), a 1992 novel by Michael Dibdin
 The Cabal, a fictional secret society in the Robert Heinlein science fiction novella If This Goes On—
 The Cabal, an organization in the TV-series of Sanctuary
 The Cabal (comics), a villainous counterpart for the Illuminati in the Marvel Comics universe
 Cabal (dog), the Latin spelling of the name of a dog belonging to King Arthur, whose Welsh name is Cavall
 The Cabal, a fictional clandestine organization in the series The Blacklist
 The Cabala, a 1926 novel by Thornton Wilder

Computing and games 
 Cabal (software), a packaging system used for Haskell programming language libraries
 Cabal (video game), a 1988 arcade game by TAD Corporation
 Computer Assisted Biologically Augmented Lifeform (CABAL), a highly advanced artificial intelligence in the Command and Conquer game Tiberian Sun, and its expansion pack Firestorm
 A secret devil-worship cult and the primary antagonists in Blood
 Cabal Online, a 2005 MMORPG developed by the South Korean company ESTsoft
 Backbone cabal, a group of administrators on Usenet in the late 80s to early 90s
 GURPS Cabal
 The Cabal, a vampiric resistance group led by Vorador in Blood Omen 2
 The Cabal, a secret organization in Tomb Raider: The Angel of Darkness
 The Cabal, a highly militarized species of alien, and one of the four alien enemy factions found in Destiny
 Cabals: Magic & Battle Cards, a 2011 online trading card game developed by Kyy Games

See also 
 Cable (disambiguation)
 Cabala (disambiguation), one of several systems of mysticism
 Kabal (disambiguation)